Caged is a 2011 Dutch erotic thriller film produced, written and directed by Stephan Brenninkmeijer. It tells the story of a married woman, who secretly indulges herself in a hedonistic lifestyle. The movie is generally considered a "drama-horror" film for its adult themes, strong erotic images and several explicit hardcore sex scenes.

Plot
Stella (Chantal Demming) has for years suppressed deep desires. She decides she can no longer ignore her feelings and begins a secret double life. She begins to lead a hedonistic life and visits sex clubs and erotic parties. Stella flourishes through all the new attention. Her husband discovers her secret life but says that she needs freedom, and hopes that it is only a phase. Then one day she finds herself unconscious in a cell and has no idea how she got there. Days go by when Christine, a woman about the same age, is brought into her cell. In the following days, they reveal their life stories to one other. Christine is convinced that the reason for their captivity lies in Stella's lifestyle.

Cast
 Chantal Demming as Stella
 Babette Holtmann as Christine / second caged woman
 Victor Reinier as Therapist
 Joep Sertons as Raymond
 Georges Devdariani as Yaroslav
 Brechje Lyklema as Gaya / Stella's friend
 Corine van der Helm as Judy / Stella's work-mate
 Frank Derijcke as Luca
 Ferry Asselbergs as Damian
 Charmène Sloof as Laura
 Lotte Taminiau as Quinty / Stella's friend
 Salar Zarza as Laura's lover at exposition hall (uncredited)

References

External links
 
 

Dutch erotic drama films
2011 films
2010s erotic drama films
2011 drama films
2010s Dutch-language films